Bill Fowler may refer to:

William Herbert Fowler (1856–1941), also known as Bill, English amateur cricketer
Bill Fowler (cricketer, born 1959), retired English cricketer
William M. Fowler (born 1944), also known as Bill, American naval historian